This is a list of episodes of the sixth season of The Ellen DeGeneres Show, which aired from September 2008 to June 2009.

Episodes

External links
 

6
2008 American television seasons
2009 American television seasons